The Milton-Freewater Unified School District (#7) is  a school district in the U.S. state of Oregon in that serves the city of Milton-Freewater and the surrounding area.

Demographics
In the 2009 school year, the district had 7 students classified as homeless by the Department of Education, or 0.4% of students in the district.

Schools
McLoughlin High School
Central Middle School is home to grades six, seven, and eight.  There are approximately 45 staff and 400 students.  Central's school mascot is the Cougar. 
Freewater Elementary School serves approximately 350 third, fourth, and fifth grade students with 44 staff.  Freewater's school mascot is the Wildcat.
Grove Elementary School houses the primary grades, kindergarten, first, and second.  Approximately 350 students are served by 53 staff.
Ferndale Elementary School is the district's only rural school located five miles North of town.  42 staff serve approximately 300 students.

References

External links
Milton-Freewater Unified School District (official site)

School districts in Oregon
Education in Umatilla County, Oregon